Justice Dyer may refer to:

Eliphalet Dyer (1721–1807), associate justice and chief justice of the Connecticut Supreme Court
Ross W. Dyer (1911–1993), associate justice of the Tennessee Supreme Court

See also
Judge Dyer (disambiguation)